Louis may refer to:

 Louis (coin)
 Louis (given name), origin and several individuals with this name
 Louis (surname)
 Louis (singer), Serbian singer
 HMS Louis, two ships of the Royal Navy

See also
Derived or associated terms
 Lewis (disambiguation)
 Louie (disambiguation)
 Luis (disambiguation)
 Louise (disambiguation)
 Louisville (disambiguation)
 Louis Cruise Lines
 Louis dressing, for salad
 Louis Quinze, design style

Associated names
 
 Chlodwig, the origin of the name Ludwig, which is translated to English as "Louis"
 Ladislav and László - names sometimes erroneously associated with "Louis"
 Ludovic, Ludwig, Ludwick, Ludwik, names sometimes translated to English as "Louis"